Restoration Path, known as Love in Action (LIA) until March 2012, was an ex-gay Christian ministry founded in 1973.

History
It was founded in 1973 by Frank Worthen, John Evans, and Kent Philpott. The program was founded in Marin County, California, just north of San Francisco. In 2010, Tommy Corman became the Executive Director of Love In Action. In March 2012, Love In Action changed its name to Restoration Path. In October 2012, David Jones became the executive director of Restoration Path; as of August 2018, he remains the Executive Director.

On July 5, 2007, Love in Action announced the initiation of Family Freedom Intensive, a monthly four-day program for parents with teens "struggling with same-sex attraction, pornography, and/or promiscuity." Teenagers who decide they would like to join their parents may be considered for inclusion. As of 2018, there is no mention of this program on the Restoration Path website.

As of October 2019, both the organization's web site and their Facebook page were offline. According to the California Secretary of State, the organization has been dissolved.

Controversies
After Jack McIntyre, a friend of co-founder John Evans, committed suicide out of despair about his inability to change, Evans left Love in Action and denounced it as dangerous. He was quoted by The Wall Street Journal (April 21, 1993) as saying: "They're destroying people's lives. If you don't do their thing, you're not of God, you'll go to hell. They're living in a fantasy world."

John Smid recounts becoming a Christian in 1982. He found that his religious conviction was incompatible with his homosexuality. He entered into a relationship with a woman and married. In 1986 he joined the leadership of Love In Action, eventually becoming executive director. Smid left LIA in 2008. In 2011, on his website, he stated that homosexuality is an intrinsic part of one's being, and that "change, repentance, reorientation and such" cannot occur, and noted that he had "never met a man who experienced a change from homosexual to heterosexual". On November 16 2014, John Smid married his same-sex partner, Larry McQueen.

Zach Stark
In June 2005, a 16-year-old Tennessee boy, Zach Stark, posted a blog entry on his MySpace site, part of which includes:

Somewhat recently, as many of you know, I told my parents I was gay.... Well today, my mother, father, and I had a very long "talk" in my room where they let me know I am to apply for a fundamentalist christian program for gays. They tell me that there is something psychologically wrong with me, and they "raised me wrong." I'm a big screw up to them, who isn't on the path God wants me to be on. So I'm sitting here in tears, joing  the rest of those kids who complain about their parents on blogs - and I can't help it.

The program Stark noted is a Love In Action-run camp known as Refuge.

On August 14, Stark updated his blog, stating that LIA had not pressured him into doing anything and he got along well with most of the clients there. He said his parents no longer let him hang out with girls as friends because it was unhealthy and that his father had asked him to stop blogging. Stark has since accepted his homosexuality, and appears in the documentary from director Morgan Jon Fox, entitled This Is What Love In Action Looks Like, which features an exclusive interview with Stark about the controversy.

A Tennessee investigation against the camp began shortly after Stark's story appeared online. As of June 28, 2005, the investigation was dropped, with Tennessee officials citing a lack of evidence of child abuse at the facilities. "Department of Children's Services dispatched its special investigations unit to the facility, and after conducting a full investigation, determined that the child abuse allegations were unfounded," Rob Johnson, an agency spokesman, told the Associated Press. On September 12, 2005, the Tennessee-based Love in Action facility was determined by the Tennessee Department of Mental Health to have been operating two "unlicensed mental health supportive living facilities". LIA stopped accepting the mentally ill and dispensing medications and, in February 2006, the state of Tennessee ceased legal action.

Tommy Corman, in 2005 the spokesman for Love In Action, said the facility did not need to be licensed because it was "not doing anything therapeutic".

Love in Action sued the state of Tennessee for discrimination against the facility. The suit was settled on October 27, 2006. Tennessee agreed that Love in Action would not need licensing as a mental health facility, and LIA agreed to make sure none of its employees administered or regulated the medication of its clients. The state of Tennessee was told to pay Love in Action's legal fees.

In June 2007, LIA discontinued the Refuge program.

In media
The 2012 book The Miseducation of Cameron Post, the debut novel of American author Emily M. Danforth, was inspired by the Zack Stark controversy above. This book was adapted as a 2018 film with the same name.

The program is described in the 2016 book Boy Erased: A Memoir by Garrard Conley, based on his experience with it. The book was adapted in 2018 as Boy Erased, a film directed by Joel Edgerton starring Lucas Hedges.

References

External links

 Love In Action, archived site

Organizations in the ex-gay movement
Christian parachurch organizations
LGBT and Christianity
Christian organizations established in 1973
Conversion therapy organizations